Friedrich "Fritz" Bindewald (31 January 1862 – 1 February 1940) was a German painter associated with the Düsseldorfer Malerschule, and a member of the Reichstag.

Life and work 
He attended the gymnasium in Laubach from 1875 to 1880, then performed one year of volunteer community service before taking his exams.

From that time until 1888, he was enrolled at the Kunstakademie Düsseldorf, where he studied history painting, anatomical drawing, and perspective. His instructors included Johann Peter Theodor Janssen, Eduard von Gebhardt, Hugo Crola, and Julius Roeting. Until 1890, he was a member of "", a nationalistic student organization. From 1888 to 1889, he served a year as a military volunteer, in the 116th Regiment. 

After 1889, he was a self-employed genre and landscape painter; with a preference for motifs from the Vogelsberg, ther Rhön, and the Bavarian Alps.

He was a self-confessed antisemite. From 1893 to 1903, and again from 1907 to 1912, he was a member of the Imperial Reichstag, representing the Grand Duchy of Hesse, for the German Reform Party. 

In 1896, he married Martha Lange (1865–1919) from Grimma, the daughter of that city's mayor. Their son, Erwin (1897–1950), was also an artist of some note.

He died on 1 February 1940 in Berlin.

Further reading 
 Hans Paffrath, Kunstmuseum Düsseldorf, Lexikon der Düsseldorfer Malerschule. Vol. 1, F. Bruckmann, Munich 1997, pg.439
 Carola Runge: "Theodor, Friedrich und Erwin Bindewald, eine Vogelsberger Künstlerfamilie in drei Generationen". In: Hessische Heimat, #40, 1990, Vols.3/4
 Helge Dvorak: Biographisches Lexikon der Deutschen Burschenschaft. Vol.1: Politicians, Koblenz 2021, pgs.15–16. (online)

External links 

 
 

1862 births
1940 deaths
19th-century German painters
German genre painters
German landscape painters
Members of the Reichstag of the German Empire
German Reform Party politicians
People from Hesse
20th-century German painters